Mladen Ličina (born 14 March 1991) is a Serbian football midfielder who plays for GSP Polet in Serbian League Belgrade.

References

External links
 
 Mladen Ličina stats at utakmica.rs 
 

1991 births
Living people
Sportspeople from Smederevo
Association football midfielders
Serbian footballers
FK Smederevo players
OFK Mladenovac players
Serbian SuperLiga players